Dioscorea chimborazensis is a type of yam in the family Dioscoreaceae. It is endemic to Ecuador.

References

chimobrazensis